Siphocampylus sulfureus is a species of plant in the family Campanulaceae. It grows as an annual herbaceous shrub to 3 m (occasionally 4 m) tall. It has tubular yellow flowers arranged in whorls around the vertical stems. The flowers emit a pungent musky smell reminiscent of foxes, particularly at night. In the day, white-throated hummingbirds (Leucochloris albicollis), Brazilian rubies (Clytolaema rubricauda) and purple-breasted plovercrests visit the flowers while at night the tailed tailless bat (Anoura caudifer) visits.

References

sulfureus
Flora of Brazil
Plants described in 1926